The 1932 Connecticut Aggies football team represented Connecticut Agricultural College, now the University of Connecticut, in the 1932 college football season.  The Aggies were led by tenth year head coach Sumner Dole, and completed the season with a record of 0–6–2.

Schedule

References

Connecticut
UConn Huskies football seasons
College football winless seasons
Connecticut Aggies football